Never Say Die is the fourth studio album of the Christian rock band, Petra. It was released in 1981. "The Coloring Song" was a radio hit for the band and sales were higher for this album than the previous. This album set the stage for Petra's success in the 1980s and their next few albums duplicated much of the formula, as well as repeated the "guitar" theme on the album cover.

The album is the first to exclusively feature Greg X. Volz on vocals, and new members John Slick and Mark Kelly (keyboards and bass guitar respectively).

StarSong Records later re-issued the album on a single CD with 1979's Washes Whiter Than. The former had two tracks cut for space; this album was included in full.

Never Say Die is their first charted album on the Billboard Top Inspirational Albums chart peaking at number 16.

Track listing

Personnel 
Petra
 Bob Hartman – guitars
 Greg X. Volz – lead and backing vocals
 John Slick – keyboards, backing vocals, horn and string arrangements on "For Annie"
 Mark Kelly – bass, backing vocals

Additional musicians
 Keith Edwards – drums, percussion
 Alex MacDougall – percussion
 Joe Miller – trombone
 Bob Welborn – trumpet

Production
 Jonathan David Brown – producer, track arrangements, engineer at Rivendell Sound Recorders, Pasadena, Texas, mixing
 Petra – track arrangements
 Steve Hall – mastering at MCA/Whitney Recording Studio,Glendale, California
 Randy Rogers – illustration
 Mary Ann Smith – layout
 Diane McLaughlin – sleeve photography
 Martinsound, Alhambra, California – additional overdubs
 Whitefield Sound, Santa Ana, California – mixing and additional overdubs

Charts

References 

Petra (band) albums
1981 albums